Harehuwa is an exclosure located in the Dogu'a Tembien woreda of the Tigray Region in Ethiopia. The area has been protected since 1999 by the local community.

Environmental characteristics
 Average slope gradient: 55%
 Aspect: the exclosure is oriented towards the west
 Minimum altitude: 2180 metres
 Maximum altitude: 2300 metres
 Lithology: Adigrat Sandstone

Management
As a general rule, cattle ranging and wood harvesting are not allowed. The grasses are harvested once yearly and taken to the homesteads of the village to feed livestock. Physical soil and water conservation has been implemented to enhance infiltration, and vegetation growth.

Benefits for the community
Setting aside such areas fits with the long-term vision of the communities were hiza’iti lands are set aside for use by the future generations. It has also direct benefits for the community:
 improved infiltration 
 improved ground water availability
 honey production
 climate ameliorator (temperature, moisture)
 carbon sequestration, dominantly sequestered in the soil, and additionally in the woody vegetation

Improved ecosystem
With vegetation growth, biodiversity in this exclosure has strongly improved: there is more varied vegetation and wildlife.

Trees
The main tree species found in the exclosure are:
 Sand olive (Dodonaea viscosa subsp. angustifolia)
 Gwarri (Euclea schimperi) 
 Lantana viburnoides
 Natal rhus (Rhus natalensis)

Soils
Main soil type in the exclosure are Phaeozems,  essentially a remnant of the time when the area was covered with natural forest.

References

External links
 Link For Forestry Projects

1999 establishments in Ethiopia
Land management
Environmental conservation
Greenhouse gas emissions
Emissions reduction
Carbon finance
Exclosures of Tigray Region
 
Dogu'a Tembien